Kurthia is a bacterial genus from the Planococcaceae family. Kurthia is a gram-positive, non-spore forming, rod-like bacteria. This strain has been isolated from diarrhea samples, however, no evidence has been brought forward suggesting it is pathogenic in nature. It has also been found in various meats, milks, and soils.

Kurthia species produce carbamoylase and hydantoinase. They also can produce L-Proline from glutamic acid or aspartic acid with the aid of a detergent.

References

Bacteria genera
Bacillales